Marianne Helena Marchand is a political scientist, researcher, feminist, and scholar who is best known for her academic writings in topics relating to international relations, globalization, feminism, and migration. Marchand is recognized for focusing on the relationship between these topics and gender in the realm of political science. Since 1995, Marchand has published academic articles in several well-known journals such as Third World Quarterly, Millennium: Journal of International Studies, and International Studies Quarterly. Most of her works found in these journals primarily relate to gender and migration in the globalizing world.

Marchand served as the Vice President of the International Studies Association and in 2017 was honored with The FTGS Eminent Scholar award. Marchand currently teaches at the Universidad de las Américas Puebla in Cholula, Mexico directing the Canadian studies program where she has received funding to pursue further research in her field.

Career

Education 
Marchand attended Leiden University where she received her Bachelor of Arts (B.A.) in History. Later on she received her masters degree with a major in Contemporary and Economic History, with minors in International Public Law, Economics, and Spanish . She then pursued her Doctorate (Ph.D.) at Arizona State University where she graduated in political science with a focus in international relations. Marchand also achieved a Master of Advanced Studies (Diplôme d'Etudes Approfondies) with a focus on International Relations.

Throughout Marchand’s career she has taught and researched in a myriad of countries including Canada, the United States, the Netherlands, Germany, Denmark, Norway, Trinidad and Tobago, and Suriname.

Marchand currently teaches at the Universidad de las Américas Puebla in Cholula, Mexico directing the Canadian studies and international relations program where she has received funding to pursue further research in her field.

Research contributions 
Marchand served as the Vice President of the International Studies Association from 2007 to 2008. In 2017 Marchand was honored with the FTGS Eminent Scholar award. In 2017 Marchand also was awarded the ISA’s Feminist Theory and Gender Studies Section Eminent Scholar Award. Marchand is also a member of the National System of Researchers (SNI). In recent years Marchand has coordinated with various administrations who have provided funding for new research within the realm of political science and migration. Most notably, Marchand has been collaborating with the CONACYT on a research project that focuses on sustainability in several communities within Mexico. Marchand has also received funding from a variety of sources to conduct research such as the Canadian government, the Dutch government, and the European Union.

Important writings 
Marchand's published works include “Feminism/postmodernism/development,” “Different communities/different realities/different encounters: A reply to J. Ann Tickner," and “Exploding the canon." One of her most famous works was the piece titled “Gender and Global Restructuring: Sightings, Sites and Resistances,” in which takes a post-9/11 feminist evaluation of the war on terror.

Publications 

 “Gender and Global Restructuring: Sightings, Sites and Resistances,” MH Marchand, AS Runyan (Routledge, 2000)
 “Feminism/postmodernism/development,” MH Marchand, JL Parpart (Routledge, 1995)
 “Exploding the canon,” MH Marchand, JL Parpart (Oxford University Press, 2001)
 “The political economy of new regionalisms,” MH Marchand, M Boas, TM Shaw (Third World Quarterly 20 (5), 897-910, 1999)
 “Feminist sightings of global restructuring: conceptualizations and reconceptualizations,” M Marchand, AS Runyan, Schuurman (Frans: Globalization and Development Studies., 135-152, 2001)
 “Introduction. Feminist Sightings of Globalization: Conceptualizations and Reconceptualizations,” MH Marchand, A Sisson Runyan, (Gender and global restructuring: Sightings, sites and resistances, 2000)
 “The weave-world: Regionalisms in the south in the new millennium,” M Boas, MH Marchand, TM Shaw (Third World Quarterly 20 (5), 1061-1070, 1999)
 “Latin American women speak on development: Are we listening yet?” MH Marchand, (LondonRoutledge, 1995)

References

External links 

Women political scientists
Political scientists
Living people
Year of birth missing (living people)